{{DISPLAYTITLE:C12H14N4O2S}}
The molecular formula C12H14N4O2S (molar mass: 278.33 g/mol, exact mass: 278.0837 u) may refer to:

 Sulfadimidine, or sulfamethazine
 Sulfisomidine